Barbara Angela Parker (born 8 November 1982) is an English track and field athlete who competes for Great Britain. She has competed in two Olympic Games and is the former UK record holder in the 3000 metres steeplechase.

Personal life
Parker was born in King's Lynn, Norfolk, England and lives in Alabama. She studied a BTEC National Diploma in Sport and Exercise Science at the College of West Anglia from 1999-2001.

Career
At the 2008 Summer Olympics, Parker represented Great Britain in the 3000 metres steeplechase. She was eliminated in the heats, running 9:51.93. She reached the final of the 3000 m steeplechase at the 2011 World Championships in Daegu after running 9:38.12 in her heat. In the final, she finished 14th with 9:56.66.

In June 2012, Parker broke the UK record in the 3000 m steeplechase with 9:24.24, which was unsurpassed until 2021. She competed at the London 2012 Olympic Games and was eliminated in the heats of both the 3000 m steeplechase and 5000 metres. In the 3000 m steeplechase, she ran 9:32.07, while in the 5000 m, she ran a personal best of 15.12.81.

References

External links

1982 births
Living people
Sportspeople from King's Lynn
British female long-distance runners
English female long-distance runners
British female steeplechase runners
English female steeplechase runners
Olympic female steeplechase runners
Olympic athletes of Great Britain
Athletes (track and field) at the 2008 Summer Olympics
Athletes (track and field) at the 2012 Summer Olympics
World Athletics Championships athletes for Great Britain
British Athletics Championships winners